The Roy Hill railway, officially the Roy Hill Infrastructure railway, owned and operated by Hancock Prospecting, is a private rail network in the Pilbara region of Western Australia built to carry iron ore.

In addition to the Hancock Prospecting network, there are three more independent iron ore rail lines in the Pilbara, making up the Pilbara Iron Ore Railways. One is operated by Rio Tinto, the Hamersley & Robe River railway, the Fortescue Metals Group operates the Fortescue railway and BHP the Goldsworthy and Mount Newman railway.

History

An application to construct the Roy Hill railway was lodged with the Environmental Protection Authority of Western Australia in October 2010. Construction of the line was scheduled to take 24 months and the operational lifespan of the line was in excess of 20 years. 

The reason for the route change was that Roy Hill Infrastructure was, subsequent to approval, unable to obtain permission from third party mining lease holders to construct the railway as approved and therefore had to alter the route.

Construction of the railway on Crown land required the passing of the Railway (Roy Hill Infrastructure Pty Ltd) Agreement Act 2010 as an amendment to the Railways (Access) Act 1998 by the Parliament of Western Australia.

The construction of the railway commenced in 2012 and was completed after 27 month, in 2015, with the first ore train travelling the line in December 2015. The new railway included eight bridges over waterways and three over roads and rails. The project jointly won the 2016 Railway Project Award of the Railway Technical Society of Australasia, alongside the Auckland Electrification Project. The combined construction cost of the mine, port and rail was A$10 billion, with a daily cost of A$10 million and a work force of 3,000 reported in 2014.

In a first for a GE locomotive, two new units as well as 150 ore cars for the Roy Hill railway were painted pink to raise breast cancer awareness in 2018.

In late 2021, Roy Hill announced a transition to a fully battery-powered, heavy-haul locomotive, manufactured by US company Wabtec, by 2023, a world first. The company, at this point, operated Wabtec ES44ACIs diesel-electric locomotives to pull their trains carrying 35,000 tonnes of iron ore.

References

External links

Pilbara Railways – rail enthusiast website
Roy Hill Infrastructure Railway Environmental Protection Authority of Western Australia
 MINEDEX website: Roy Hill Port Infrastructure and Rail Database of the Department of Mines, Industry Regulation and Safety

Iron ore railways
Mining railways in Western Australia
Railway lines in the Pilbara
Railway lines opened in 2015
Standard gauge railways in Australia
2015 establishments in Australia